The 2014 BetVictor World Matchplay was the 21st annual staging of the darts tournament, the World Matchplay, organised by the Professional Darts Corporation. The tournament took place at the Winter Gardens, Blackpool, from 19–27 July 2014.

Phil Taylor won the event for the seventh consecutive year and 15th in total by beating Michael van Gerwen 18–9 in the final. Taylor also threw the event's only nine-dart finish which he did in the second round against Michael Smith.

Prize money
The prize fund was increased to £450,000 after being £400,000 for the previous five editions of this event. The bonus for a nine-dart finish stood at £10,000 and was won by Phil Taylor.

Format
In previous stagings of the event all games had to be won by two clear legs with no sudden-death legs. However, in 2013 after consulting the host broadcaster Sky Sports, the PDC decided that games will now only proceed for a maximum of six extra legs before a tie-break leg is required. For example, in a best of 19 legs first round match, if the score reaches 12–12 then the 25th leg will be the decider.

Qualification
The top 16 in the PDC Order of Merit qualified as seeded players. The other 16 places went to the top 16 non-qualified players from the PDC ProTour Order of Merit who are unseeded players.

PDC Top 16
  Michael van Gerwen (runner-up)
  Phil Taylor (winner)
  Adrian Lewis (quarter-finals)
  Simon Whitlock (semi-finals)
  James Wade (quarter-finals)
  Peter Wright (first round)
  Robert Thornton (first round)
  Andy Hamilton (second round)
  Dave Chisnall (quarter-finals)
  Wes Newton (quarter-finals)
  Gary Anderson (semi-finals)
  Brendan Dolan (first round)
  Raymond van Barneveld (second round)
  Mervyn King (second round)
  Justin Pipe (first round)
  Ian White (second round)

PDC ProTour qualifiers
  Kim Huybrechts (first round)
  Steve Beaton (first round)
  Vincent van der Voort (first round)
  Jamie Caven (first round)
  Michael Smith (second round)
  Terry Jenkins (first round)
  Dean Winstanley (first round)
  Ronnie Baxter (first round)
  Kevin Painter (first round)
  Stephen Bunting (second round)
  Darren Webster (first round)
  Andrew Gilding (first round)
  Wayne Jones (first round)
  Andy Smith (first round)
  Paul Nicholson (second round)
  Richie Burnett (second round)

Draw

Statistics
{|class="wikitable sortable" style="font-size: 95%; text-align: right"
|-
! Player
! Eliminated
! Played
! Legs Won
! Legs Lost
! LWAT
! 100+
! 140+
! 180s
! High checkout
! 3-dart average
|-
|align="left"|  Phil Taylor
| Winner
| 5
| 74
| 40
| 29
| 148
| 94
| 30
| 160
| 103.92
|-
|align="left"|  Michael van Gerwen
| Final
| 5
| 65
| 54
| 22
| 153
| 75
| 36
| 145
| 99.91
|-
|align="left"|  Gary Anderson
| Semi-finals
| 4
| 54
| 41
| 18
| 124
| 75
| 33
| 145
| 101.30
|-
|align="left"|  Simon Whitlock
| Semi-finals
| 4
| 52
| 41
| 23
| 108
| 73
| 32
| 154
| 95.09
|-
|align="left"|  Adrian Lewis
| Quarter-finals
| 3
| 31
| 28
| 12
| 78
| 36
| 13
| 113
| 101.71
|-
|align="left"|  Dave Chisnall
| Quarter-finals
| 3
| 35
| 30
| 12
| 71
| 50
| 24
| 134
| 97.87
|-
|align="left"|  James Wade
| Quarter-finals
| 3
| 33
| 23
| 16
| 77
| 48
| 11
| 114
| 95.04
|-
|align="left"|  Wes Newton
| Quarter-finals
| 3
| 32
| 38
| 12
| 73
| 51
| 11
| 160
| 85.92
|-
|align="left"|  Michael Smith
| Second round
| 2
| 16
| 21
| 5
| 34
| 27
| 14
| 112
| 99.66
|-
|align="left"|  Ian White
| Second round
| 2
| 14
| 17
| 3
| 47
| 21
| 7
| 160
| 96.98
|-
|align="left"|  Andy Hamilton
| Second round
| 2
| 20
| 16
| 8
| 40
| 27
| 10
| 160
| 95.98
|-
|align="left"|  Stephen Bunting
| Second round
| 2
| 18
| 19
| 5
| 46
| 32
| 5
| 167
| 95.87
|-
|align="left"|  Mervyn King
| Second round
| 2
| 18
| 17
| 7
| 30
| 33
| 7
| 101
| 95.33
|-
|align="left"|  Richie Burnett
| Second round
| 2
| 12
| 17
| 6
| 52
| 19
| 4
| 121
| 90.64
|-
|align="left"|  Raymond van Barneveld
| Second round
| 2
| 18
| 17
| 10
| 38
| 30
| 10
| 132
| 89.79
|-
|align="left"|  Paul Nicholson
| Second round
| 2
| 23
| 23
| 10
| 57
| 31
| 6
| 142
| 89.45
|-
|align="left"|  Robert Thornton
| First round
| 1
| 8
| 10
| 4
| 31
| 13
| 4
| 112
| 97.06
|-
|align="left"|  Justin Pipe
| First round
| 1
| 8
| 10
| 1
| 29
| 9
| 6
| 127
| 96.66
|-
|align="left"|  Darren Webster
| First round
| 1
| 4
| 10
| 1
| 19
| 11
| 3
| 92
| 96.58
|-
|align="left"|  Dean Winstanley
| First round
| 1
| 4
| 10
| 2
| 21
| 12
| 2
| 66
| 94.43
|-
|align="left"|  Steve Beaton
| First round
| 1
| 7
| 10
| 3
| 18
| 11
| 3
| 122
| 92.77
|-
|align="left"|  Andrew Gilding
| First round
| 1
| 0
| 10
| 0
| 11
| 7
| 2
| –
| 92.55
|-
|align="left"|  Kim Huybrechts
| First round
| 1
| 4
| 10
| 1
| 16
| 6
| 1
| 72
| 92.53
|-
|align="left"|  Jamie Caven
| First round
| 1
| 8
| 10
| 1
| 27
| 9
| 2
| 132
| 92.03
|-
|align="left"|  Terry Jenkins
| First round
| 1
| 4
| 10
| 0
| 15
| 9
| 4
| 60
| 91.28
|-
|align="left"|  Kevin Painter
| First round
| 1
| 6
| 10
| 3
| 18
| 14
| 3
| 92
| 90.86
|-
|align="left"|  Andy Smith
| First round
| 1
| 5
| 10
| 2
| 27
| 11
| 0
| 120
| 89.67
|-
|align="left"|  Peter Wright
| First round
| 1
| 6
| 10
| 0
| 20
| 13
| 4
| 84
| 89.12
|-
|align="left"|  Vincent van der Voort
| First round
| 1
| 4
| 10
| 2
| 12
| 7
| 7
| 75
| 89.10
|-
|align="left"|  Brendan Dolan
| First round
| 1
| 4
| 10
| 1
| 18
| 9
| 1
| 91
| 88.91
|-
|align="left"|  Wayne Jones
| First round
| 1
| 3
| 10
| 2
| 13
| 8
| 2
| 96
| 82.45
|-
|align="left"|  Ronnie Baxter
| First round
| 1
| 9
| 11
| 3
| 23
| 7
| 3
| 81
| 81.62
|-

References

World Matchplay (darts)
World Matchplay
World Matchplay